Michael Farfán Stopani (born June 23, 1988) is an American former soccer player.

Career

Youth and College
Played youth club soccer in Southern California where he captured numerous team titles, including the 2002 national championship. He also played in the Youth World Championships in Japan in 2000 representing a Mexican youth national team.

Farfan played for Castle Park High School in Chula Vista, California where he won All-CIF honors as an underclassman. He later played for Edison Academic Center in Bradenton, Florida while training for the United States U-17 team. As a member of the U-17 team, Farfan played in the 2005 Youth World Cup. After a two-year residency on the United States U-17 team, he enrolled at Fullerton State in the Spring of 2006.

Farfan enrolled in the University of North Carolina in January 2009. He scored five goals with the Tar Heels, with three coming in the first four games, and had four assists. While at North Carolina, he was named NSCAA First Team All-America and All-ACC First Team.

During his college years Farfan also played extensively in the USL Premier Development League, for Orange County Blue Star, Ventura County Fusion, the Los Angeles Legends, and the Ogden Outlaws.

Professional
On January 13, 2011, Farfan was drafted in the second round (23rd overall) in the 2011 MLS SuperDraft by the Philadelphia Union. He made his professional debut on April 6, 2011 in a Lamar Hunt U.S. Open Cup game against D.C. United and scored his first professional goal – a 25-yard drive from outside the box – on May 21, 2011 in a 2–1 win over Chicago Fire.  He was part of the MLS Team of Week 10 for this performance.

After three seasons in Philadelphia, Farfan was sold to Cruz Azul of Liga MX ahead of the 2014 Clasura. He scored in his debut with Cruz Azul against Pachuca. Farfan was released by Cruz Azul just 6-months into his 3-year deal.

Farfan was signed by D.C. United on February 10, 2015.

Farfan signed with Seattle Sounders FC on January 20, 2016.

On February 24, 2017, Farfan announced his retirement via Facebook.

Career statistics

Club

Updated March 13, 2015

Personal
Michael's brother, Gabriel Farfán, was also a professional soccer player for before retiring in 2018.

Honors

Club
Cruz Azul
CONCACAF Champions League (1): 2013–14

Individual
Major League Soccer All-Star Team: 2012

References

External links
 
 UNC bio
 

1988 births
Living people
American soccer players
American expatriate soccer players
Cal State Fullerton Titans men's soccer players
North Carolina Tar Heels men's soccer players
Orange County Blue Star players
Ventura County Fusion players
LA Laguna FC players
Ogden Outlaws players
Philadelphia Union players
Cruz Azul footballers
D.C. United players
Seattle Sounders FC players
Tacoma Defiance players
Soccer players from San Diego
Expatriate footballers in Mexico
USL League Two players
Major League Soccer All-Stars
Major League Soccer players
Liga MX players
USL Championship players
Twin sportspeople
Philadelphia Union draft picks
Sportspeople from Chula Vista, California
United States men's youth international soccer players
All-American men's college soccer players
Association football midfielders